"Are You Getting Enough?" is a song by British rapper Professor Green, featuring singer Miles Kane. It was released on 21 July 2013 and it only appears on the deluxe version of Growing Up in Public. The track features vocals from the British singer Miles Kane. The song was written by Professor Green, Miles Kane and Kid Harpoon, and produced by Kid Harpoon.

Background and release
On 24 May 2013, Green was due to perform at a student ball in Hartpury College. However, he was run over by a delivery van and broke his leg. Wretch 32 took to the stage as a last-minute replacement for the gig. During the same week, Green was due to premiere the single and announce details about the new album. Despite the traumatic circumstances, this still went ahead. The song received its debut on Zane Lowe's BBC Radio 1 show on 28 May 2013. It was later made available to stream via SoundCloud, which also saw the premiere of the official artwork. Regarding the track, Green tweeted the following:
"It's not read all about it pt. 4, it's not another 'i need you tonight'. it's not house. it is what is is. let's 'ave it!!!".
The Kaos remix features on the Ministry of Sound compilation The Sound of Dubstep Worldwide 4.

Track listing

Charts

Weekly charts

Release history

References

2013 singles
Virgin Records singles
Professor Green songs
2013 songs
Songs written by Kid Harpoon
Songs written by Professor Green
Songs written by Miles Kane